Sangarus or Sangaros was a town of ancient Bithynia near the shore of the Propontis. In the 4th century, an early Christian sect, the Novatianists, held a synod here. Yitzhak ha-Sangari may have been a native.

Sangaros must be somewhere on the coast from Çınarcık/Yalova to Hersek Asiatic Turkey.<ref> (https://pleiades.stoa.org/places/511407; Sokrates, History of the Church, V.21)

References

Populated places in Bithynia
Former populated places in Turkey
History of Yalova Province